American Institute of International Law was an international scientific association for the study and progress of international law in the Americas. The idea to form an organization that would codify international law was established at a meeting of the Third Committee of American Jurists in Rio de Janeiro on July 16, 1912. The institute was founded on October 12, 1912 by James Brown Scott and Alejandro Alvarez, and inaugurated December 29, 1915, at the Second Pan American Scientific Congress, held in Washington, D.C. On January 6, 1916, it adopted a Declaration of the Rights and Duties of Nations. The Declaration differed from other projects of a like kind in that it was not based solely upon philosophic principles, but was based exclusively upon decisions of the Supreme Court of the United States.

The organization met irregularly through at least 1938, churning out several international law papers on topics such as statehood, diplomatic and consular agents, and peaceful international dispute resolution.  By 1957, due in part to a lack of financial resources, the Institute was no longer active.

Objectives 
The goals of the institute were:
To give precision to the general principles of international law as they now exist, or to formulate new ones, in conformity with the solidarity which unites the members of the society of civilized nations, in order to strengthen these bonds and, especially, the bonds between the American peoples;
 To study questions of international law, particularly questions of an American character, and to endeavor to solve them, either in conformity with generally accepted principles, or by extending and developing them, or by creating new principles adapted to the special needs of the American Continent;
 To discover a method of codifying the general or special principles of international law, and to elaborate projects of codification on matters which lend themselves thereto;
 To aid in bringing about the triumph of the principles of justice and of humanity which should govern the relations between peoples, considered as nations, through more extensive instruction in international law, particularly in American universities, through lectures and addresses, as well as through publications and all other means;
 To organize the study of international law along truly scientific and practical lines in a way that meets the needs of modern life, and taking into account the problems of our hemisphere and American doctrines;
 To contribute, within the limits of its competence and the means at its disposal, toward the maintenance of peace, or toward the observance of the laws of war and the mitigation of the evils thereof;
 To increase the sentiment of fraternity among the Republics of the American Continent, so as to strengthen friendship and mutual confidence among the citizens of the countries of the New World.

Charter members

Argentina: Luis María Drago
Bolivia: 
Brazil: Ruy Barbosa
Chile: Alejandro Álvarez
Colombia: :es:Antonio José Uribe
Costa Rica: :es:Luis Anderson Morúa
Cuba: Antonio Sánchez de Bustamante y Sirven
Dominican Republic: Andres Julio Montolio
Ecuador: :es:Rafael María Arízaga
Guatemala: :es:Antonio Batres Jáuregui
Haiti: Jacques Nicolas Léger
Honduras: :es:Alberto de Jesús Membreño
Mexico: Joaquín Demetrio Casasús
Nicaragua: Salvador Castrillo
Panama: Federico Boyd
Paraguay: Manuel Gondra
Peru: :es:Ramón Ribeyro
Salvador: Rafael S. Lopez
United States of America: James Brown Scott
Uruguay: Carlos Maria de Pena
Venezuela: Jose Gil Fortoul

References

Bibliography

Legal research institutes
Pan-Americanism
Organizations based in Washington, D.C.
Organizations established in 1912
1912 establishments in the United States